Conasprella saecularis is a species of sea snail, a marine gastropod mollusk in the family Conidae, the cone snails and their allies.

Like all species within the genus Conasprella, these cone snails are predatory and venomous. They are capable of "stinging" humans, therefore live ones should be handled carefully or not at all.

Description
The size of the shell varies between 17 mm and 40 mm.

Distribution
The marine species occurs in the Persian Gulf and in the Western Pacific.

References

  Puillandre N., Duda T.F., Meyer C., Olivera B.M. & Bouchet P. (2015). One, four or 100 genera? A new classification of the cone snails. Journal of Molluscan Studies. 81: 1–23.

External links
 The Conus Biodiversity website
Cone Shells – Knights of the Sea

Gallery

saecularis
Gastropods described in 1898